The 2012 Michigan House of Representatives elections were held on November 6, 2012, with partisan primaries to select the parties' nominees in the various districts on August 7, 2012. Due to gerrymandering, the Republican Party retained its majority in the House of Representatives despite losing the popular vote.

Rep. Roy Schmidt scandal
State Representative Roy Schmidt was defeated for re-election after assisting in engineering an election-rigging scandal by which he switched from the Democratic to the Republican Party and recruited a straw candidate to run as a Democrat in order to ensure a swift re-election. The scandal ultimately cost him his seat in the House. Speaker of the House James "Jase" Bolger was also implicated in the scandal, and his race for the 63rd district was made competitive because of his role in it. The matter was referred to Ingham County Circuit Court Judge Rosemarie Aquilina, serving as a one-person grand jury, who ruled in August 2013 that neither Schmidt nor Bogler had committed a crime.

Term limits
Due to the term limit provisions in the Michigan Constitution, the following Members were ineligible to stand for election again to the House:
 Dave Agema (R-74th district)
 Joan Bauer (D-68th district)
 Barb Byrum (D-67th district)
 Bob Constan (D-16th district)
 Jud Gilbert (R-81st district)
 Rick Hammel (D-48th district)
 Ken Horn (R-94th district)
 Marty Knollenberg (R-41st district)
 Richard LeBlanc (D-18th district)
 Steven Lindberg (D-109th district)
 Mark Meadows (D-69th district)
 Chuck Moss (R-40th district)
 Paul Opsommer (R-93rd district)

Results

Districts 1–28

Districts 29–55

Districts 56–83

Districts 84–110

Special elections

References
 Gongwer News Service: 2012 General Election—Michigan House

House of Representatives
2012
Michigan House of Representatives
November 2012 events in the United States